An oversight board is a governance structure, responsible for ensuring compliance with the law or other standards.

Specifically, oversight board may refer to:

United States federal government 

 Privacy and Civil Liberties Oversight Board, an advisory agency to the President of the United States
 Intelligence Oversight Board, responsible for examining violations of the laws and directives governing clandestine surveillance
 Public Company Accounting Oversight Board, a nonprofit corporation created by Congress to oversee the audits of public companies and others
 Financial Stability Oversight Board, responsible for monitoring the operation of the Troubled Asset Relief Program
 Financial Oversight and Management Board of Puerto Rico, created by the PROMESA act in response to the Puerto Rican government-debt crisis

Other 

 Professional Oversight Board, formerly an agency of the United Kingdom's Financial Conduct Authority
 Public Interest Oversight Board, an independent international organisation contributing to the International Federation of Accountants's work
 Oversight Board (Facebook), established by Facebook to take decisions concerning censorship and free speech
 Civilian police oversight agency, a citizen organisation monitoring police officer conduct
 Nashville Community Oversight Board, the civilian oversight agency monitoring police in Nashville, Tennessee